Taikus (also, Tagas, Tagus, Taiku, Taikushi, and Tigres) is a former Maidu settlement in Butte County, California. It was located near Cherokee at the head of Dry Creek; its precise location is unknown.

References

Former settlements in Butte County, California
Former Native American populated places in California
Lost Native American populated places in the United States
Maidu villages